The Tuvaluan football league system, is a series of non-interconnected leagues for club football in Tuvalu.

Structure
The A-Division contains 8 teams. Alongside the A-Division is the B-Division (Level 2), which contains 5 reserve teams of clubs in the A-Division. All the teams in the A and B-Division are amateur teams and there is no promotion or relegation between the two.

References

Football league systems in Oceania